William Weston I (c. 1351 – c. 1419) was the member of Parliament for Surrey for nearly 40 years from November 1380.

References 

Members of the Parliament of England for Surrey
1350s births
Year of birth uncertain
Year of death uncertain
English MPs November 1380
English MPs November 1390
1410s deaths
English MPs 1393
English MPs 1394
English MPs January 1397
English MPs 1401
English MPs 1415
English MPs 1419